In mathematics,  is the infinite series whose terms are the successive powers of two. As a geometric series, it is characterized by its first term, 1, and its common ratio, 2. As a series of real numbers it diverges to infinity, so in the usual sense it has no sum. In a much broader sense, the series is associated with another value besides ∞, namely −1, which is the limit of the series using the 2-adic metric.

Summation 

Therefore, any totally regular summation method gives a sum of infinity, including the Cesàro sum and Abel sum. On the other hand, there is at least one generally useful method that sums  to the finite value of −1. The associated power series
 
has a radius of convergence around 0 of only  so it does not converge at  Nonetheless, the so-defined function  has a unique analytic continuation to the complex plane with the point  deleted, and it is given by the same rule  Since  the original series  is said to be summable (E) to −1, and −1 is the (E) sum of the series. (The notation is due to G. H. Hardy in reference to Leonhard Euler's approach to divergent series).

An almost identical approach (the one taken by Euler himself) is to consider the power series whose coefficients are all 1, that is,

and plugging in  These two series are related by the substitution 

The fact that (E) summation assigns a finite value to  shows that the general method is not totally regular. On the other hand, it possesses some other desirable qualities for a summation method, including stability and linearity. These latter two axioms actually force the sum to be −1, since they make the following manipulation valid:

In a useful sense,  is a root of the equation  (For example,  is one of the two fixed points of the Möbius transformation  on the Riemann sphere). In this case  may be subtracted from both sides of the equation, yielding  so 

The above manipulation might be called on to produce −1 outside the context of a sufficiently powerful summation procedure. For the most well-known and straightforward sum concepts, including the fundamental convergent one, it is absurd that a series of positive terms could have a negative value. The arguments are ultimately justified for these convergent series, implying that  and  but the underlying proofs demand careful thinking about the interpretation of endless sums.

It is also possible to view this series as convergent in a number system different from the real numbers, namely, the 2-adic numbers. As a series of 2-adic numbers this series converges to the same sum, −1, as was derived above by analytic continuation.

See also 
 1 − 1 + 2 − 6 + 24 − 120 + ⋯
 1 − 1 + 1 − 1 + ⋯ (Grandi's series)
 1 + 1 + 1 + 1 + ⋯
 1 − 2 + 3 − 4 + ⋯
 1 + 2 + 3 + 4 + ⋯
 1 − 2 + 4 − 8 + ⋯

Notes

References

Further reading 

Binary arithmetic
Divergent series
Geometric series
P-adic numbers